The 2007–08 season was Aston Villa's 20th consecutive season in the top flight of English football and 16th consecutive season in the Premier League. The season saw Martin O'Neill continue as manager as the club impressed in league competition, but struggled in both domestic cup competitions – being knocked out in the third round of both.

Final league table

Players

First team squad

Left club during season

Reserve squad
The following players made most of their appearances playing for the reserves, but may have also appeared for the youth team.

Youth squad
The following players made most of their appearances playing for the youth team, but may have also appeared for the reserves.

Other players

Kit
The 2007–08 season saw the unveiling of Nike as the club's kit producer, taking over from Danish firm Hummel. The deal – worth £25 million over 5 seasons – was announced on 7 February 2007, with all home, away and goalkeeper kits being unveiled on 17 July 2007. The home shirt was made available to purchase on 8 August 2007, and the away on 4 October 2007. A charcoal and white third shirt was unveiled and released in November 2007. The home shirt followed the club's usual template of a claret body and blue arms, with a white "AVFC" banner and printed lion featured on the hem and back of the collar respectively. The away shirt featured a white body, with blue pinstripes – in a similar style to that of the 1982 European Cup winners’ jersey (which featured claret stripes in place of the modern blue alternative). The third shirt was charcoal with white piping. The home goalkeeper shirt featured horizontal stripes, with different alternating shades of grey. The away replicated this style, with different shades of yellow.

Gibraltar-based betting firm 32Red continued their sponsorship of the club, however with the contract in its last year, Villa are expected to announce another deal for the forthcoming 2008–09 season.

Crest
A new crest was revealed on 2 May 2007 to be introduced for the 2007–08 season. The new crest included a star to represent the European Cup win in 1982, and has a light blue background behind Villa's "lion rampant." The traditional motto "Prepared" remained in the crest, and the name "Aston Villa" was shortened to AVFC, FC having been omitted from the previous crest. Randy Lerner petitioned fans to help with the design of the new crest.

Transfers

Summer transfer window
Following the transfer of prolific striker Juan Pablo Ángel to New York Red Bulls in April, several Villa first-teamers followed the Colombian out of the door in the summer of 2007. Gavin McCann joined Bolton Wanderers in £1 million deal on 12 June, then a fortnight later, versatile defender Aaron Hughes left for Fulham, also in a £1 million deal. McCann was joined by Jlloyd Samuel – who had spent much of the previous season on the bench for the Midlanders – at Bolton, signing on a free transfer when his contract expired on 1 July. However, the two most surprising deals occurred with two academy players, in Steven Davis and Liam Ridgewell. Davis – who had won Player of the Year for the club in the 2005–06 season – signed for Fulham on 5 July for an undisclosed fee. Liam Ridgewell made the trip across the city to Birmingham City on 3 August, in a £2 million move. Other moves saw midfielder Lee Hendrie end his 14-year association with the club in a free transfer to Sheffield United, Phil Bardsley returned to Manchester United after a 13-game loan stint at the club, whilst Stephen Henderson, Bobby Olejnik, Mark Delaney, Scott Bridges and Eric Djemba-Djemba all left Villa Park.

Villa clinched their first transfer on 5 July with the £8.5 million signing of midfield battler Nigel Reo-Coker from West Ham United. 11 days later, Marlon Harewood also moved from Upton Park, for an undisclosed fee. Scott Carson was the next to arrive on 10 August, in a loan switch from Liverpool (although some media sources claim a fee of £2 million up front was agreed), before defenders Zat Knight and Curtis Davies both signed on 29 and 31 August respectively. Knight signed for his hometown club for a fee of £3.5 million from Fulham, whilst Davies signed on a season-long loan from local rivals West Bromwich Albion. Other deals saw Austrian youngsters Andreas Weimann and Dominik Hofbauer sign, as well as Eric Lichaj, Harry Forrester and Togolese international Moustapha Salifou.

Winter transfer window
After failing to find a suitor in the summer, Gary Cahill was allowed to leave on a loan deal to Sheffield United in September; however, he joined Bolton on a permanent deal on 30 January for an undisclosed fee. Youngsters Chris Herd, Tobias Mikaelsson, Stephen O'Halloran and Zoltán Stieber were all farmed out on loan. The biggest news, however, was that Swedish international defender Olof Mellberg, was to join Italian giants Juventus on a free transfer at the end of the season.

Unlike the summer transfer window, Aston Villa were extremely quiet in the winter equivalent, purchasing just one senior player in Wayne Routledge (£1.25 million) from Tottenham Hotspur. He was also followed by youngsters Thomas Dau and Lance Heslop.

Summary

In

Out

Pre-season results

Players of the year
At the end of season awards dinner, Martin Laursen was announced as the Supporters' Player of the Year, whilst Gabriel Agbonlahor was the Supporter's and Player's Young Player of the Year.

Results

Premier League

Results by matchday

League Cup

FA Cup

Statistics

Appearances and goals
As of end of season

|-
! colspan=14 style=background:#dcdcdc; text-align:center| Goalkeepers

|-
! colspan=14 style=background:#dcdcdc; text-align:center| Defenders

|-
! colspan=14 style=background:#dcdcdc; text-align:center| Midfielders

|-
! colspan=14 style=background:#dcdcdc; text-align:center| Forwards

|-
! colspan=14 style=background:#dcdcdc; text-align:center| Players transferred or loaned out during the season

|-

Topscorers
  John Carew – 13
  Gabriel Agbonlahor – 11
  Ashley Young – 9
  Gareth Barry – 8
  Martin Laursen – 6

Notes

References

External links
Aston Villa official website
avfchistory.co.uk 2007–08 season

Aston Villa F.C. seasons
Aston Villa